Allothelaira is a genus of flies in the family Tachinidae.

Species
 Allothelaira analis (Walker, 1860)
 Allothelaira diaphana Villeneuve, 1915
 Allothelaira luteicornis (Townsend, 1927)

References

Taxa named by Joseph Villeneuve de Janti
Diptera of Asia
Diptera of Africa
Diptera of Australasia
Dexiinae
Tachinidae genera